The Thinker's Library was a series of 140 small hardcover books published between 1929 and 1951 for the Rationalist Press Association by Watts & Co., London, a company founded by the brothers Charles and John Watts. 

The series was launched at the time when Watts & Co. was being run by Charles Albert Watts. A member of the company's board of directors, Archibald Robertson, took an active interest in setting up the series and it was he who suggested the series' name.  

The Thinker's Library consisted of a selection of essays, literature, and extracts from greater works by various classical and contemporary humanists and rationalists, continuing in the tradition of the Renaissance.  Many of the titles were cheap reprints of classic books, aimed at a mass audience.

Catalogue of titles
Each volume consists of an eponymous essay sometimes followed by a collection of related essays by the same author, or an introductory extract from a greater work by that author. Any deviation from this format will be self-explanatory from the title. All foreign language texts were published in the English language.

 First and Last Things by H. G. Wells
 Education: Intellectual, Moral, and Physical by Herbert Spencer
 The Riddle of the Universe by Ernst Haeckel
 Humanity's Gain from Unbelief, and Other Selections from the Works of Charles Bradlaugh (1929)
 On Liberty by John Stuart Mill
 A Short History of the World by H. G. Wells
 The Autobiography of Charles Darwin by Charles Darwin
 The Origin of Species by Charles Darwin
 Twelve Years in a Monastery by Joseph McCabe
 History of Modern Philosophy by A. W. Benn (1930)
 Gibbon on Christianity – chapters 15 and 16 of Edward Gibbon's Decline and Fall of the Roman Empire (1930)
 The Descent of Man – Part 1 and the concluding chapter of Part 3, by Charles Darwin (1930)
 History of Civilization in England – Vol. I, by Henry Thomas Buckle
 Anthropology – Vol. I, by Sir Edward B. Tylor
 Anthropology – Vol. II, by Sir Edward B. Tylor
 Iphigenia – Two plays, by Euripides, translated by C. B. Bonner
 Lectures and Essays by Thomas Henry Huxley
 The Evolution of the Idea of God by Grant Allen
 An Agnostic's Apology, and Other Essays by Sir Leslie Stephen (March 1931)
 The Churches and Modern Thought by Vivian Phelips
 Penguin Island by Anatole France
 The Pathetic Fallacy by Llewelyn Powys
 Historical Trials (A Selection) by Sir John MacDonell
 A Short History of Christianity by J. M. Robertson
 The Martyrdom of Man by Winwood Reade
 Head-hunters, Black, White, and Brown by Alfred C. Haddon (1932)
 The Evidence for the Supernatural by Ivor Ll. Tuckett
 The City of Dreadful Night and other poems – A selection from the poetical works of James Thomson (1932)
 In the Beginning: The Origin of Civilisation by G. Elliot Smith
 Adonis: a Study in the History of Oriental Religion – from The Golden Bough by Sir James G. Frazer (1932)
 Our New Religion by H. A. L. Fisher
 On Compromise by John Morley
 A History of the Taxes on Knowledge by Collet Dobson Collet
 The Existence of God by Joseph McCabe (1933)
 The Story of the Bible by MacLeod Yearsley
 Savage Survivals: The Story of the Race Told in Simple Languages by J. Howard Moore
 The Revolt of the Angels by Anatole France
 The Outcast by Winwood Reade
 Penalties Upon Opinion by Hypatia Bradlaugh Bonner
 Oath, Curse, and Blessing by Ernest Crawley
 Fireside Science by Sir E. Ray Lankester
 History of Anthropology by Alfred C. Haddon (1934)
 The World's Earliest Laws by Chilperic Edwards (1934)
 Fact and Faith by J. B. S. Haldane
 The Men of the Dawn by Dorothy Davison
 The Mind in the Making by James Harvey Robinson
 The Expression of the Emotions in Man and Animals by Charles Darwin
 Psychology for Everyman (and Woman) by A. E. Mander
 The Religion of the Open Mind by Adam Gowans Whyte
 Letters on Reasoning by J. M. Robertson
 The Social Record of Christianity by Joseph McCabe
 Five Stages of Greek religion: Studies Based on a Course of Lectures Delivered in April 1912 at Columbia University by Gilbert Murray (1935)
 The Life of Jesus by Ernest Renan (1935)
 Selected Works of Voltaire by Joseph McCabe
 What are we to do with our lives? by H. G. Wells
 Do What You Will by Aldous Huxley (1936)
 Clearer Thinking (Logic for Everyman) by A. E. Mander
 History of Ancient Philosophy by A. W. Benn
 Your Body: How it is built and how it works by D. Stark Murray
 What is Man? by Mark Twain (1936)
 Man and His Universe by John Langdon-Davies
 First Principles by Herbert Spencer
 Rights of Man by Thomas Paine
 This Human Nature by Charles Duff
 Dictionary of Scientific Terms as Used in the Various Sciences by Charles Marsh Beadnell
 A Book of Good Faith by Montaigne
 The Universe of Science by Hyman Levy
 Liberty To-day by C. E. M. Joad
 The Age of Reason by Thomas Paine
 The Fair Haven by Samuel Butler (1938)
 A Candidate for Truth: Passages from Emerson (1938)
 A Short History of Women by John Langdon-Davies
 Natural Causes and Supernatural Seemings by Henry Maudsley
 Morals, Manners, and Men by Havelock Ellis (1939)
 Pages from a Lawyer's Notebooks by E. S. P. Haynes
 An Architect of Nature – The autobiography of Luther Burbank (1939)
 Act of God by F. Tennyson Jesse
 The Man versus The State by Herbert Spencer
 The World as I See It by Albert Einstein (1940)
 Jocasta's Crime: An Anthropological Study by Lord Raglan
 The Twilight of the Gods and Other Tales by Richard Garnett
 Kingship by A. M. Hocart
 Religion Without Revelation by Julian Huxley
 Let the People Think by Bertrand Russell
 The Myth of the Mind by Frank Kenyon
 The Liberty of Man and Other Essays by Robert G. Ingersoll
 Man Makes Himself by V. Gordon Childe
 World Revolution and the Future of the West by W. Friedmann (1942)
 The Origin of the Kiss and Other Scientific Diversions by Charles Marsh Beadnell
 The Bible and its Background. Vol. I. by Archibald Robertson
 The Bible and its Background. Vol. II. by Archibald Robertson
 The Conquest of Time by H. G. Wells (1942)
 The Gospel of Rationalism by Charles T. Gorham
 Life's Unfolding by Sir Charles Sherrington (1944)
 An easy Outline of Astronomy by M. Davidson
 The God of the Bible by Evans Bell
 Man Studies Life by G. N. Ridley
 In Search of the Real Bible by A. D. Howell Smith
 The Outlines of Mythology by Lewis Spence
 Magic and Religion by Sir James G. Frazer
 Flight from Conflict by Laurence Collier
 Progress and Archaeology by V. Gordon Childe (1944)
 The Chemistry of Life by J. S. D. Bacon
 Medicine and Mankind by Arnold Sorsby
 The Church and Social Progress by Marjorie Bowen [pen-name of Margaret Gabrielle Long]
 The Great Mystics by George Godwin
 The Religion of Ancient Mexico by Lewis Spence
 Geology in the Life of Man by Duncan Leitch
 A Century for Freedom by Kenneth Urwin
 Jesus: Myth or History? by Archibald Robertson
 The Ethics of Belief and Other Essays by William Kingdon Clifford
 Human Nature, War and Society by John Cohen
 The Rational Good: A Study in the Logic of Practice by L. T. Hobhouse
 Man: The Verdict of Science by G. N. Ridley
 The Distressed Mind by J. A. C. Brown
 The Illusion of National Character by Hamilton Fyfe (1940)
 Population, Psychology, and Peace by J. C. Flugel
 Friar's Lantern by G. G. Coulton
 Ideals and Illusions by L. Susan Stebbing
 An Outline of the Development of Science by M. Mansel Davies
 Head and Hand in Ancient Greece: Four Studies in the Social Relations of Thought by Benjamin Farrington
 The Evolution of Society by J. A. C. Brown
 Background to Modern Thought by C. D. Hardie
 The Holy Heretics: The Story of the Albigensian Crusade by Edmond Holmes
 Man His Own Master by Archibald Robertson
 Men Without Gods by Hector Hawton
 The Earliest Englishman by Sir Arthur Smith Woodward
 Astronomy for Beginners by Martin Davidson
 The Search for Health by D. Stark Murray
 The Mystery of Anna Berger by George Godwin
 Wrestling Jacob by Marjorie Bowen [Pen-name of Margaret Gabrielle Long]
 The Origins of Religion by Lord Raglan (1949)
 The Hero: A Study in Tradition, Myth, and Drama by Lord Raglan
 The Life of John Knox by Marjorie Bowen [Pen-name of Margaret Gabrielle Long]
 The French Revolution by Archibald Robertson
 The Art of Thought by Graham Wallas
 Literary Style and Music by Herbert Spencer
 The Origin of Species by Charles Darwin (reprint of first edition) (printed but unpublished)
 The Science of Heredity by J. S. D. Bacon
 The Great Revivalists by George Godwin (1951)

Bibliography
Cooke, Bill (2003). The Blasphemy Depot: A Hundred Years of the Rationalist Press Association. London: Rationalist Press Association. . Republished as: The Gathering of Infidels: A Hundred Years of the Rationalist Press Association'', Amherst, New York: Prometheus Press, 2006. .

References

External links
Rationalist Press Association – The Thinker's Library – The Rationalist Press Association's relevant page includes extracts from some volumes.

Series of non-fiction books
Philosophy books